Eagle FM may refer to:
 Eagle FM (Nepal)
 Eagle FM (Namibia)
Eagle FM (Australia), a radio station in Goulburn, Australia
 Eagle FM 95.5, a radio station in the Philippines
Eagle FM, a radio station in Northern Region, Ghana

See also
Eagle Radio, a former local commercial radio station in England